Stancil is an extinct town in Pemiscot County, in the U.S. state of Missouri. The GNIS classifies it as a populated place.

A post office called Stancil was established in 1890, and remained in operation until 1906. The community has the name of John P. Stancil, a state legislator.

References

Ghost towns in Missouri
Former populated places in Pemiscot County, Missouri